Quetta is the capital city of the Pakistani province of Balochistan.

Quetta may also refer to:

Places
related to Quetta, Pakistan:
Quetta District, the district
Quetta Division, the third-tier administrative subdivision
Quetta Cantonment, a military cantonment in Quetta
Quetta, Queensland, a locality in Queensland, Australia

Other uses
 quetta-, a metric prefix denoting a factor of 1030
 Quetta: A City of Forgotten Dreams, a 2016 Pakistani drama film
 RMS Quetta, a merchant ship that wrecked in 1890

See also
 
 
 Quetta Gladiators, a cricket team in the Pakistan Super League